The Red Party, also known as the Party of the Regeneration and nicknamed together the Tailed Ones, was an historical Dominican political party from the late 19th century to the mid-20th century founded by Buenaventura Báez. Ramón Cáceres and Horacio Vásquez were the main leaders of this party in the 20th century, and as such, during this time the followers of this party were also known as Horacistas.

The symbol of this party, and where its name came from, was a rooster with its tail, where the rivals' symbol Los Bolos was tailless. The Red Party was banned in 1930 after Rafael Trujillo's coup. Founded as a party supporting poor peasants and the low-income masses in urban areas, it was generally more popular amongst citizens than Los Bolos, which tended to be more associated with intellectuals. Its ideological heir is the Social Christian Reformist Party.

References

See also
 Political parties in the Dominican Republic
 History of the Dominican Republic

Defunct political parties in the Dominican Republic
Political parties established in 1865
1865 establishments in North America
Political parties disestablished in 1930
1930 disestablishments in North America
Conservative parties in North America
Banned political parties